Project for Sky-Writing (planche n°1)  is a photograph  by  artist Robert Filliou from 1971

Description
The photograph is silkscreen printed on paper and has dimensions of  69 x 96.5 cm.

The print is part of the collection of the Museum of Modern Art in Antwerp, Belgium.

Analysis
Robert Filliou was involved in the Fluxus movement. and Dada. In 1971, this work was part of a series of prints exhibited at the Museum of Modern Art.

References

1971 works
1971 in art
Fluxworks
1970s photographs